School of Social Work, Zimbabwe,  is a college campus in Harare,  Zimbabwe. It offers undergraduate and postgraduate courses in social work. It is a department of the Midlands State University, Zimbabwe  Midlands State University.

Courses

Bachelor Of Science Social Work
Master of Science in Social Work
Postgraduate Diploma in Social Work
Certificate in Social Work

References

External links

Social work education
Midlands State University